Trummer is an uninhabited island in the River Fergus in County Clare located between Deer Island and Coney Island, Ireland.

Islands of County Clare
Uninhabited islands of Ireland
River islands of Ireland